Highway 375 (AR 375, Ark. 375, and Hwy. 375) is a designation for one east-west and one north–south state highway in Polk County, Arkansas. A western route of  runs east from U.S. Route 59/U.S. Route 71 (US 59/US 71) at Potter Junction to Highway 8 in Mena. A second route of  begins at Highway 8 outside of Mena and runs south to County Road 630 in the Ouachita National Forest.

Route description

Potter Junction to Mena
Highway 375 begins at US 59/US 71 at Potter Junction. The route runs west through farms and wooded areas before turning north to Potter. Highway 375 turns east and runs due east to terminate at Highway 8 shortly after entering Mena.

Mena to Ouachita National Forest
Highway 375 begins at Highway 8 outside of Mena and runs southeast through Dallas. The route continues southeast to enter the Ouachita National Forest where it becomes a narrow road with almost no shoulder and limited signage.  375 had many sharp turns as it crosses the mountain and is NOT passable by large trucks, ie. 18 wheelers.  Highway 375 terminates at County Road 81 (community of Shady).  Polk County Road 64 continues East where 375 ends. CR 64 is a partial paved/dirt road that enters the forest and is not passable by large trucks.

Major intersections

See also

Notes

References

External links

375
Transportation in Polk County, Arkansas